Yin Hang (born 7 February 1997) is a female Chinese race walker who specialises in the 20 kilometres and 50 kilometres race walk. She was the silver medallist over 50 km at the 2017 World Championships in Athletics.

Biography
She took part in the 2017 World Championships inaugural 50 km women's event on August 13, 2017 where she won the silver medal in 4 h 08 min 58 s thereby beating her previous Asian Record. The race saw the participation of just seven athletes, out of which only four officially finished.

See also
China at the 2017 World Championships in Athletics

References

External links

1997 births
Living people
Chinese female racewalkers
World Athletics Championships athletes for China
World Athletics Championships medalists